The Piala Belia is a youth football competition for Under-19 players in Malaysia. The competition consists of youth squads from clubs competing in the Malaysian football league system and also youth squads from sports schools under the management of the Football Association of Malaysia (FAM). The competition exists alongside the developmental competition for Under-21 players, the Piala Presiden.

History 
Since its inception in 2008, the Piala Belia has been a major tournament for Under-19 players. In 2009 to 2011, the competition was combined with the Piala Presiden. In 2015 the format of the competition was changed to a league format.

In 2016, the tournament format was also changed with the clubs being divided into two groups and played a round-robin leg, with four top clubs from each group at the end of the season qualifying for the playoff round to determine the champion. The final match for the cup is broadcast by Astro Arena.

Logo evolution 
Since the inception of the competition in 2008, numerous logos have been introduced to reflect the sponsorship. For the 2017 season a new logo was unveiled.

Results

Team records

Notes

See also 
 Piala Presiden

References

External links 
 

 
Football cup competitions in Malaysia